V Sport Golf is a pan-Nordic television channel dedicated to broadcasting golf tournaments and golf-related programmes.

The channel was launched in January 2007 after MTG had acquired many rights for live broadcasting of golf tournaments, such as the US PGA Tour, the PGA European Tour, the European Challenge Tour, the European Seniors Tour, the Scandinavian Masters, the Sunshine Tour, the Ryder Cup, the World Golf Championships, the Seve Trophy, the Australasian Tour and the Southern Africa Tour. Viasat Golf took the space that had been used for Viasat Sport 24. Golf tournaments that had been aired on Viasat Sport 1 and SportN were moved to Viasat Golf.

In 2020, the channel was renamed V Sport Golf.

References

External links
Viasat Golf 
Viasat Golf 

V Sport
Golf on television
Sports television in Denmark
Television stations in Denmark
Television channels in Finland
Television channels in Norway
Television channels in Sweden
Television channels and stations established in 2007